Cochliopalpus boranus is a species of beetle in the family Cerambycidae. It was described by Müller in 1938.

References

Ceroplesini
Beetles described in 1938